La Carolina is a Quito Metro station. It was officially inaugurated opened on 21 December 2022 as part of the inaugural section of the system between Quitumbe and El Labrador. After the official inauguration, the system functions in the testing regime. The station is located between Iñaquito and Pradera.

This is an underground station. 

The station is located at the intersection of Avenida Eloy Alfaro and Avenida de La República, in the southern part of La Carolina Park and next to the financial center of Quito. It has four exits.

The tunnel construction reached La Carolina on 21 August 2017. On 23 January 2023, the first train with 600 passengers to whom invitations were extended, arrived to the station.

References

Quito Metro
2022 establishments in Ecuador
Railway stations opened in 2022